Beckstein may refer to:
 Beckstein (Lauda-Königshofen), district of Lauda-Königshofen, a town in the Main-Tauber district in Baden-Württemberg, Germany.

People with the name
 Günther Beckstein (1943), German CSU politician from Bavaria
 Sinclair Beckstein, author of the book "Oh Brother, Where Art Thou?", an amalgamation of the names of authors Upton Sinclair, Sinclair Lewis, and John Steinbeck